Norbert Fabián Čapek (Czech pronunciation: [ˈtʃapɛk]; 3 June 1870 – 30 October 1942) was the founder of the modern Unitarian Church in Czechoslovakia.

Early life
Čapek was born into a Roman Catholic family on 3 June 1870 in Radomyšl, a market town in Strakonice District in southern Bohemia. As a boy he wanted to join the priesthood, but soon became disillusioned with the church. At the age of 18 he left Catholicism for the Baptist church and was ordained a minister.

Čapek traveled widely as a Baptist evangelist, from Saxony in the west to the Ukraine in the east. In Moravia he was influenced by the free Christianity and the Moravian Brotherhood, and his religious convictions became progressively more liberal and anti-clerical. He wrote for and edited a number of journals. His articles on topics ranging from psychology to politics attracted unfavorable attention from the German authorities, and in 1914 he and his wife, Marie, and their eight children fled to the United States.

Unitarianism
In the United States, Norbert became editor of a Czech language newspaper and served as pastor of the First Slovak Baptist Church in Newark, New Jersey. Widowed shortly after his arrival in US, Čapek met and married another Czech expatriate, Mája Oktavec, in 1917. She had been born in Chomutov in Western Bohemia in 1888 and moved to the U.S. at the age of 19. She was a graduate of the School of Library Science at Columbia University and worked in the New York Public Library.

While in the United States, Čapek faced two heresy trials at the accusation of Slovak Baptist ministers, in attempts to expel him from the Baptist association. Pursuing an increasingly liberal religious perspective, Norbert resigned as a Baptist minister in 1919. Norbert and Maja discovered Unitarianism, and in 1921 they joined the First Unitarian Church of Essex County (in Orange, New Jersey). Together, they decided to bring Unitarianism back to their homeland, newly independent after World War I. The couple returned to Prague in 1921.

The new Unitarian congregation they formed in Prague, called the Liberal Religious Fellowship, grew rapidly and soon purchased a large building dubbed "Unitaria" at the foot of Charles Bridge. The early worship services generally consisted of lectures. The minister wore no robe or vestments; and the congregation dispensed with elaborate rituals, singing of hymns, ornate decoration, and formal or prescribed prayers. Some members felt that the congregation lacked a spiritual dimension. In response, in June 1923 Čapek created the Flower Celebration (aka Flower Communion): each member would bring a flower to the church, where it was placed in a large central vase.  At the end of the service, each would take home a different flower. This symbolized the uniqueness of each individual, and the coming together in communion to share this uniqueness.

Maja Capek was ordained as a minister in 1926. With financial help from the American Unitarian Association and the British and Foreign Unitarian Association, Norbert and Maja acquired and renovated a medieval palace for a meeting space. In 1930 the Unitarian Church of Czechoslovakia was officially recognized by the Czech government.

World War II

Although he was invited to return to the United States during World War II, Čapek chose to remain in Europe. In 1939 Maja went to the US to raise funds for relief efforts in Czechoslovakia; she also served as minister in the North Unitarian Church in New Bedford, Massachusetts from 1940 to 1943. In March 1941, Norbert and his daughter were arrested by the Gestapo, who confiscated his books and sermons. He was charged with listening to foreign broadcasts (a capital crime) and, after being held in Pankrác Prison, was taken in 1942 to the Dachau concentration camp, where he was imprisoned in the "Priesterblock". He was tortured and eventually gassed late in 1942.

When news of his death reached the United States, the American Unitarian Association president, Fredrick May Eliot, wrote, "Another name is added to the list of heroic Unitarian martyrs, by whose death our freedom has been bought. Ours is now the responsibility to see to it that we stand fast in the liberty so gloriously won."

The International Association for Religious Freedom placed a plaque in the camp in his memory.

References

Further reading
Henry, Richard (1999). Norbert Fabian Capek: A Spiritual Journey, Skinner House Books. 
Brown, Andrew, James (2007). The Religious Society of Czech Unitarians (RSCU) and the construction of Czech National Identity. In: Lucia Faltin, Melanie J. Wright (eds), The Religious Roots of Contemporary European Identity, London : Continuum, p. 143-155.

External links
 Norbert Čapek from the Unitarian Universalist Association website.
 Norbert Čapek from the Dictionary of Unitarian and Universalist Biographies.
 Flower Communion and Norbert Capek from the First Parish Cambridge [MA] Unitarian Universalist Church website.
 Nobert Capek from the Harvard Square Library website.

1870 births
1942 deaths
People from Strakonice District
People from the Kingdom of Bohemia
Czech Unitarians
Czech people who died in Dachau concentration camp
20th-century Unitarian clergy
Czechoslovak civilians killed in World War II
People killed by gas chamber by Nazi Germany
Former Baptists
Former Roman Catholics